
Year 745 (DCCXLV) was a common year starting on Friday (link will display the full calendar) of the Julian calendar. The denomination 745 for this year has been used since the early medieval period, when the Anno Domini calendar era became the prevalent method in Europe for naming years.

Events 
 By place 

 Byzantine Empire 
 Bubonic plague in Asia Minor kills 1/3 of the population, and subsequently sweeps through the Peloponnese (Balkan Peninsula)  (approximate date).

 Europe 
 Hunald I, duke of Aquitaine, retires to a monastery, probably on Île de Ré. He is succeeded by his son Waifar, who struggles during his rule for independence against the Frankish Kingdom.
 Carantania (modern Austria) loses its independence and becomes part of the Frankish Kingdom, due to the pressing danger posed by Avar tribes from the east (approximate date).

 Asia 
 China has accomplishments in poetry, painting and printing, but its monarchical system tends toward failure. Emperor Xuan Zong has fallen under the spell of his son's wife Yang Guifei (one of the Four Beauties of Ancient China), a Taoist priestess. He is ignoring the economy and the Tang Dynasty is declining.
 The newly founded Uyghur Empire controls most of the former Turkic Empire territory, creating an empire that extends from Lake Balkash (modern Kazakhstan) to Lake Baikal (Mongolia), and is subject to Chinese suzerainty (approximate date).

 By topic 
 Religion 
 Genbō, Japanese scholar-monk, is exiled to Dazaifu on the island of Kyushu.

Births 
 Idris I, emir and founder of the Idrisid Dynasty (d. 791)
 Muhammad ibn Mansur al-Mahdi, Muslim caliph (or 744)
 Musa al-Kadhim, seventh Twelver Shī‘ah imām (d. 799)
 Wei Gao, general of the Tang Dynasty (d. 805)
 Willehad, bishop of Bremen (approximate date)
 Yaoshan Weiyan, Chinese Buddhist monk (d. 827)
 Zhang Jianfeng, statesman of the Tang Dynasty (d. 800)

Deaths 
 Cathal Maenmaighe, king of Uí Maine (Ireland)
 Daniel, bishop of Winchester
 Herlindis of Maaseik, Frankish abbess (or 753)
 Ingwald, bishop of London
 Kadobe, Japanese prince
 Kulun Beg, ruler (khagan) of the Turkish Empire
 Thrasimund II, duke of Spoleto 
 Wilfrid, bishop of York
 Yusuf ibn Umar al-Thaqafi, Muslim governor

References